Jesús Mosquera Bernal (born 23 February 1993) is a Spanish ex-footballer turned actor, best known for his portrayal of Hugo Beltrán in Toy Boy.

Career as footballer 
Born in the southern coastal town of Fuengirola in the province of Málaga, Mosquera played as a central defender and began his career at Málaga CF, at the age of 12. He was in the youth academy of the Andalusian club, making a switch to the other side of Spain to join Athletic Bilbao at the age of 16. At the age of 18, Mosquera returned to Málaga, enrolling in the reserve team of Málaga CF. He also went through Betis B and Antequera, his last clubs before quitting football and turning to acting.

Career as actor 
After being discovered at a gym in Málaga, Mosquera auditioned for a small role in his breakout show. The producers saw in him a raw potential for stardom, which led him to being cast as the lead in Toy Boy instead of the bit part.

Filmography

References

External links
 

1993 births
Living people
Male actors from Andalusia
Spanish male television actors
21st-century Spanish male actors
Spanish footballers
Footballers from Andalusia
Atlético Malagueño players
Betis Deportivo Balompié footballers
People from Fuengirola
Sportspeople from the Province of Málaga
Association football central defenders
Athletic Bilbao footballers
Spanish people of Basque descent
Málaga CF players